Be Afraid - Be Very Afraid may refer to:

 "Be afraid. Be very afraid.", tagline and quote from The Fly (1986 film)  
 Be Afraid – Be Very Afraid! (August 1999), book from the Goosebumps Series 2000
 Chonda Pierce: Be Afraid… Be Very Afraid (2002), comedy video by Chonda Pierce
 Be Afraid, Be Very Afraid: The Book of Scary Urban Legends (2004), written by Jan Harold Brunvand